"Voy a quedarme" ("I am going to stay") is a song by Spanish singer Blas Cantó. The song was released as a digital download and for streaming on 10 February 2021. It represented Spain in the Eurovision Song Contest 2021, after winning a two-song selection.

Context
The composition of the song was prompted by losses in Cantó's life, including the death of his grandmother in 2020 followed by his father's death. In an interview with the Eurovision specialist website Wiwibloggs, he said that the song was a sort of reconciling with these losses. The death of his father came as Spain was announcing its decision to re-confirm him to represent Spain in the contest. The music video includes a portray of him dancing with his "grandmother". In a Zoom meeting with Wiwibloggs, he said that the song was like a miracle and healing process. "I needed to perform on that stage. I needed to share my music, my soul", he said.

Eurovision Song Contest

The song was selected to represent Spain in the Eurovision Song Contest 2021, after Blas Cantó was selected through Destino Eurovisión 2021, the music competition that selects Spain's entries for the Eurovision Song Contest. As Spain is a member of the "Big Five", the song automatically advanced to the final, which was held on 22 May 2021 at the Rotterdam Ahoy in Rotterdam, Netherlands.

English version
Cantó also presented a translated English language version titled "I'll Stay". On May 17, 2021, Blas Cantó also released a duo version of "I'll Stay" featuring James Newman, the representative of the United Kingdom in the Eurovision Song Contest for the same year.

Charts

References

2021 singles
2021 songs
Blas Cantó songs
Eurovision songs of 2021
Eurovision songs of Spain
Spanish-language songs
Warner Music Spain singles
Songs written by Leroy Sanchez